Agnès Evren (born 27 December 1970) is a French politician of the Republicans (LR) who was elected as a Member of the European Parliament in 2019.

Political career

Career in national politics
Evren served as Valérie Pécresse’s spokesperson when she ran in the 2015 regional elections. When Pécresse became head of the Regional Council of Île-de-France, she was elected one of its vice presidents, in charge of education and culture.

Member of the European Parliament, 2017–present
Evren became a member of the European Parliament in 2019. She has since has been serving on the Committee on the Environment, Public Health and Food Safety and on the Committee on Petitions.

In addition to her committee assignments, Evren is part of the parliament's delegations for relations to Afghanistan, Palestine and to the Parliamentary Assembly of the Union for the Mediterranean. She is also a member of the European Parliament Intergroup on Climate Change, Biodiversity and Sustainable Development and the URBAN Intergroup.

In 2018, Evren was named spokesperson for Pécresse’s Soyons libres (SL) movement. Later that year, she left SL again to chair the Paris chapter of LR. 

Since the 2020 elections, Evren has been serving as a member of the Council of Paris, representing the city’s 15th arrondissement. For the campaign, she received a public endorsement by Rachida Dati.

Ahead of the 2022 French presidential election, LR chairman Christian Jacob appointed Evren and Gilles Platret as the party’s spokespeople. She has since been serving as one of the spokespersons of Pécresse’s campaign team.

Personal life
Evren is of Turkish origin.

References

1970 births
Living people
French people of Turkish descent 
MEPs for France 2019–2024
21st-century women MEPs for France
The Republicans (France) MEPs
Politicians from Paris
Pantheon-Sorbonne University alumni